Auriol Kensington Rowing Club is a rowing club in Hammersmith, west London, England. The club was formed in 1981 by the amalgamation of Auriol Rowing Club which was founded in 1896 and Kensington Rowing Club which was founded in 1872. The clubhouse is on Lower Mall adjacent to Hammersmith Bridge.

Rowing is divided into senior squads for oarsmen and women, a novice group and a masters section for those 27+ not entering Senior (foremost adult) races.

Groups compete throughout the year at events such as the Fours Head, the Women's Eights Head of the River Race, the Head of the River Race, the Veterans Head during the winter and, on a different stretch of river in the summer, Henley Women's Regatta and Henley Royal Regatta. The club and its predecessors have a good record of winners of the Wingfield Sculls.  The club also annually enters competitions in the Lea Valley, upstream to Reading, Berkshire, including multi-lane national events at Dorney Lake such as 'the Met' and Wallingford Regattas, manage to send crews to compete in the nearest weekly summer regattas elsewhere and leading oarsmen and women in most years find a competition in which to compete abroad.

Its nationally notable adult winners since 2010 have included trainee Olympic professional athletes and have won race categories including in the Wingfield Sculls, Weybridge Silver Sculls and the 2013 Masters British Championships.  It is a mid-ranking London club by high level success.  Away from the highest categories of Senior and Junior, its crews tend to achieve alike success to other clubs in London including those on the Putney Embankment; plus some exceptional single scullers.

Honours

Henley Royal Regatta

British champions

See also
Rowing on the River Thames

References

External links
 Auriol Kensington Rowing Club official website

Tideway Rowing clubs
Sport in Hammersmith and Fulham
Rowing clubs of the River Thames